Jakobus Johannes Wiese (born 16 May 1964) is a former South African rugby union player who played at lock for the South Africa national rugby union team between 1993 and 1996. He was a specialist number 2 jumper in the lineout, and rampant in the tight loose and loose.(Sports Deck trading card 1994 issue, card no 08) He is married and has two kids.

Playing career

Provincial
The  1993 side won the M-NET Night Series, Percy Frames Trophy, Super 10, Lion Cup and Currie Cup.

International
Wiese made his debut for the Springboks in the first test against France in 1993, which ended in a 20-all draw. He lost his test place after this, but was part of the touring squads to Australia in 1993, New Zealand in 1994 and Wales and Scotland at the end of 1994, before returning to the test team against  before the 1995 World Cup. He was part of the winning squad of the 1995 Rugby World Cup.

He received a three-match ban for punching and knocking unconscious Derwyn Jones of Wales in the 40–11 win in 1995. Jones was a major line out threat and was rendered unconscious and sidelined by a punch from behind in the fourth minute of the match. Wiese later scored a try in that match, but received a 30-day ban and a 50,000 Rand fine for his action.

He won his last cap for the Springboks on 15 December 1996 against Wales at Cardiff Arms Park in Cardiff. Wiese has a unique distinction as he never played in a losing Springbok side when he made the first XV.

Test history 
 World Cup Final

Honours

Province
 Winner of the Currie Cup 1993, 1994
 Finalist in the Currie Cup 1991, 1992
 Winner of Super 10 in 1993

World Cup
 1995 : World Champions, 5 selections (Romania, Canada, Samoa, France, All Blacks).

Business Career 
Since 1994, Kobus and his wife Belinda Wiese have worked in the coffee industry. They began this business by joining a small group of coffee roasters dispersed widely across South Africa.

Kobus, who spotted a gap in the coffee industry, opened up shop in a small space on the East Rand.

Due to the café's popularity, Kobus had to increase the number of seats availabe as well as the  As a result, he increased the number of quality food options on the menu.

He then established Wiesenhof Coffee Shop in 1998, however he left the company's "The Roastery" at its core unaltered.

.

Later career
He is also  a consultant and TV sports presenter.

See also

List of South Africa national rugby union players – Springbok no. 585

References

External links

 Springboks 1995, 1996
 scrum.com statistics
 sporting-heroes.net Photography and statistics on the national team
 speakerpartnership.com
 

South African rugby union players
South Africa international rugby union players
Rugby union locks
1964 births
Living people
Golden Lions players
Lions (United Rugby Championship) players
South African expatriate rugby union players
Expatriate rugby union players in Italy
South African expatriate sportspeople in Italy
Alumni of Paarl Gimnasium
Rugby union players from the Western Cape